Bolshoy Kunaley (Yekhe Khunilaa) is a rural locality (a selo) in Tarbagataysky District of the Republic of Buryatia, Russia.

In 2016 Bolshoy Kunaley was included in The Most Beautiful Villages in Russia.

References 

Rural localities in Tarbagataysky District
Transbaikal Oblast